Ramadan Bey Square is one of the squares in the medina of Tunis.

It was named after Ramadan Bey (or Romdhane Bey), a sovereign from the Muradid dynasty.

Location 
Ramadan Bey Square is at the intersection of six streets :
 Pacha street
 Bir Lahjar street
 Sidi Ben Arous street
 Sayda Ajoula street
 The Agha street
 Ben Nejma street

References 

Streets in Tunis
Medina of Tunis